Asher Cohen  is an Israeli psychologist. He has been the 14th President of the Hebrew University of Jerusalem since September 1, 2017, and holds the university's Samuel Sturman Chair in Psychology.

Biography
Asher Cohen graduated from the Hebrew University of Jerusalem with a B.A. in Economics and an M.A. in Psychology. He completed his doctoral and post-doctoral studies at the University of Oregon.

Academic career
Cohen was a senior lecturer and Assistant Professor at Indiana University.

Cohen returned in the early 1990s to the Hebrew University’s Department of Psychology, in the Faculty of Social Sciences. From 2008 to 2012, he was the head of the university's Department of Psychology. From 2012 to 2017, Cohen was the Hebrew University’s Rector.

Cohen has been the 14th President of the Hebrew University of Jerusalem since September 1, 2017, succeeding Menahem Ben-Sasson, who was President of the University for eight years. He holds the university's Samuel Sturman Chair in Psychology.

See also
Education in Israel

References

External links
 "Alain Elkann Interviews: Asher Cohen," November 10, 2013
 "Asher Cohen interviewed for l'X on air," November 28, 2016

Academic staff of the Hebrew University of Jerusalem
Indiana University faculty
21st-century Israeli educators
Israeli expatriates in the United States
Hebrew University of Jerusalem Faculty of Social Sciences alumni
University of Oregon alumni
20th-century Israeli educators
Presidents of universities in Israel
Israeli psychologists
Living people
Year of birth missing (living people)